Lee Peak is a peak along the west side of Scott Glacier,  north of Mount Denauro, in the Queen Maud Mountains of Antarctica. It was mapped by the United States Geological Survey from surveys and U.S. Navy air photos, 1960–64, and was named by the Advisory Committee on Antarctic Names for Frank P. Lee, a photographer on aerial flights in Antarctica during U.S. Navy Operation Deep Freeze 1965, 1966 and 1967.

References

Description:	A peak along the W side of Scott Glacier, 3 mi N of Mount Denauro, in the Queen Maud Mountains. Mapped by U.S. Geological Survey (USGS) from surveys and U.S. Navy (USN) air photos, 1960–64. Named by Advisory Committee on Antarctic Names (US-ACAN) for Frank P. Lee, photographer on aerial flights in Antarctica during U.S. Navy (USN) Operation Deep Freeze (OpDFrz) 1965, 1966 and 1967.

Mountains of the Ross Dependency
Amundsen Coast